Bruce Michael Mackintosh Hlibok (July 31, 1960 - June 23, 1995) was an American deaf actor.

Early life
Hlibok was born in Flushing, New York to deaf parents, Albert and Margaret Hlibok, and was the eldest of four siblings. He directed his first formal play at Union League of Deaf in 1978, was a member of Metro Jr. NAD and attended Youth Leadership Camp. He attended Lexington School for the Deaf briefly then graduated from Horace Mann School, Riverdale, New York in 1979. He went to Gallaudet College and then transferred to New York University, where he graduated in journalism and play writing.

Career
Hlibok was the first deaf actor to play a main role in a Broadway production, Runaways, composed and directed by Elizabeth Swados and produced by Joseph Papp. The musical premiered off-Broadway on February 21, 1978, at the Public Theater Cabaret as presented by the New York Shakespeare Festival. It moved to Broadway at the Plymouth Theatre on May 13, 1978, and closed on Dec 31, 1978 after 274 performances and 12 previews. Hlibok was the first to use sign language in the rhythm of music on stage. The play received five Tony Awards nominations.

Hlibok founded a theater company, Handstone Productions and authored a children book about his sister, Nancy, attending the Juilliard School of Dance, titled, Silent Dancer in 1981. He also served as a consultant for theaters for the deaf and on ASL in general theater.

Hlibok completed twelve written plays which were then produced at off-off Broadway theatres in Manhattan, New York; Paris, France; and Amsterdam, Netherlands. He staged a one-man show, The Deaf-Mute Howls, based on Albert V. Ballin's memoir. He acted in an off Broadway play, "Another Person is a Foreign Country", and his last role was in an off Broadway play, The Heart is a Lonely Hunter in 1994. He also was known for his poetry in both American Sign Language and English.

Personal life and death
Hlibok lived in New York nearly all his life, starting with Flushing, Queens, then he moved to Manhattan for a while before settling in Jersey City, New Jersey. His long-term partner, Neal Johnson, who was a creative artist for Avon Products, died in 1987.{{cn{}}

On June 23, 1995, Hlibok died at the age of 34 from pneumonia, a complication caused by AIDS. His family created an endowment in his memory at Gallaudet University which created an annual playwriting competition, The Bruce Hlibok Playwriting Competition, and a library of resources at the Elstad Theatre on campus.

References

 Obituary, "Bruce Hlibok, 34, A Broadway Actor And a Playwright", New York Times. (July 2, 1995). Retrieved March 22, 2015.
 History, Deafpeople.com. http://deafpeople.com/history/history_info/hlibok.html. Retrieved March 22, 2015. 
 Moore, M., & Panara, R. (1996). Great deaf Americans: The second edition (2nd ed.). Rochester, N.Y.: Deaf Life Press.
September 1995- "Leading light: A Tribute to Bruce Hlibok". Deaf Life, Issue 3. Retrieved March 22, 2015.
June 1, 1994 - By STEPHEN HOLDEN - Arts; Theater - Print Headline: "Reviews/Theater; The Desperation of Life in McCullers Country". New York Times. Retrieved March 22, 2015.
September 10, 1991 - By STEPHEN HOLDEN - Arts; Theater - Print Headline: "Review/Theater; In Decayed, Empty Nursing Home, A Pageant of the Lame and Hurt". New York Times. Retrieved March 22, 2015.
Hlibok, B. (1987). Bruce Hlibok script. RIT/NTID Deaf Studies Archive.  http://library.rit.edu/findingaids/html/RITDSA.0044.html
May 15, 1978 - By RICHARD EDER - Print Headline: "'Runaways' Moves Up to Broadway; Pain of Childhood". New York Times. Retrieved March 22, 2015.
March 27, 1978 - By GEORGIA DULLEA - Print Headline: "For 'Runaways' Parents, a Play That Is More Than Just Theater; Opened Their Hearts A Real Life Story Problem Children", New York Times. Retrieved March 22, 2015. 
March 20, 1981 - By Albin Krebs and Robert Thomas - New York and Region - Print Headline: "Notes on People; SINGING AND COMMUNICATING IN HIS OWN SPECIAL WAY"
March 10, 1978 - By MEL GUSSOW - Print Headline: "Stage: Inspired 'Runaways'; Whither Youth?" New York Times. Retrieved March 22, 2015.
October 3, 1973 - By VIRGINIA LEE WARREN - Print Headline: "They're All Deaf but, as a Family, They Don't Feel Handicapped; Read a Visitor's Lips". New York Times. Retrieved March 22, 2015
Hlibok, B., & Glasgow, L. (1981). "Silent Dancer". New York City, New York: Messner.
Bryan, A. M. (2002). "On and off stage: the Bruce Hlibok story. New York: Deaf Vision Filmworks. DVD.
Eastman, G.; Dellon, J.; Norman, J, Ph. D. (1985) "Deaf Mosaic: #108". Department of Television, Film, and Photography: VHS. Washington, D.C.: Gallaudet University.
Cook, P.S.; Lerner, K.; Hlibok, B.; Carmel, S.J.; Malzkuhn, E. (1989). "Flying Words event held at Writers and Books". DVD. Rochester, N.Y. : National Technical Institute for the Deaf, 1989.
Swado, E; et al. (1978). "Runaways". New York Public Library, Billy Rose Theatre Collection, Theatre on Film and Tape Archive. Videocassette : NTSC color broadcast system. 
Shaw, B.; Hlibok, B.; Stone, J. (1980). "Androcles and the lion". Picture: Artwork reproduction. Washington, DC : Gallaudet College Theatre, 1980.
Jessup, H, et al. (1978) "The Baxters Christmas Special". VHS. Boston Broadcasters, Inc.; WCVB-TV (Television station : Needham, Mass.).
Swados, E. (1978, 2003). "Runaways: original Broadway cast: a New York Shakespeare Festival Production". Music CD. New York, N.Y.: DRG Records, Sony Music Custom Marketing Group.

1960 births
1995 deaths
People from Flushing, Queens
American male deaf actors
Gallaudet University alumni
New York University alumni
People from Jersey City, New Jersey
AIDS-related deaths in New Jersey